Robert Erskine Morrison (26 March 1902 – 19 February 1980) was a British rower who competed in the 1924 Summer Olympics.

Morrison was born at Richmond on Thames, and he was educated at Eton College and at Trinity College, Cambridge, where he was a member of the Pitt Club.  At Cambridge, Morrison, James MacNabb, Maxwell Eley and Terence Sanders, who had rowed together at Eton, made up the coxless four that in 1922 at Henley won the Stewards' Challenge Cup as Eton Vikings and the Visitors' Challenge Cup as Third Trinity Boat Club. Morrison rowed for Cambridge in the Boat Race in 1923 and was again in the winning crew for the Stewards' Challenge Cup  The coxless four crew won Steward's at Henley again in 1924 and went on to win the gold medal for Great Britain  rowing at the 1924 Summer Olympics. In 1925 at Henley Morrison won the Stewards's Challenge Cup, the Visitors' Challenge Cup and the Silver Goblets  partnering Edric Hamilton-Russell.

Morrison became an engineer and worked around the country until he retired to Longstanton, Cambridgeshire in 1976.

See also
List of Cambridge University Boat Race crews

References

1902 births
1980 deaths
People educated at Eton College
Alumni of Trinity College, Cambridge
English male rowers
British male rowers
Olympic rowers of Great Britain
Rowers at the 1924 Summer Olympics
English Olympic medallists
Olympic gold medallists for Great Britain
Olympic medalists in rowing
Cambridge University Boat Club rowers
Medalists at the 1924 Summer Olympics